The plumbeous sierra finch (Geospizopsis unicolor) is a species of bird in the family Thraupidae.

It is found in Argentina, Bolivia, Chile, Colombia, Ecuador, Peru, and Venezuela. Its natural habitats are subtropical or tropical high-altitude grassland and pastureland.

References

External links
Image at ADW

plumbeous sierra finch
Birds of the Andes
plumbeous sierra finch
Taxonomy articles created by Polbot